Trapeze is a 1956 American circus film directed by Carol Reed and starring Burt Lancaster, Tony Curtis and Gina Lollobrigida, in her American film debut. The film is based on Max Catto's 1950 novel The Killing Frost, with an adapted screenplay written by Liam O'Brien.

The film performed well at the box office, placing among the top three earners of 1956 in the United States and Canada and as the fourth-most-popular film at the British box office in 1956.

Plot
Embittered trapeze aerialist and former star Mike Ribble needs a cane to walk, the result of a fall during a performance. Brash, inexperienced Tino Orsini wants Mike to train him to do the dangerous triple somersault. Mike, only the sixth man to complete the triple, brushes him off at first, but comes to believe that Tino is capable of matching his feat and starts teaching him. However, the manipulative Lola enamors Tino, convinced that he is a star in the making. Mike is pressured into adding her to the new act. 

Tensions rise as Lola and Mike are attracted to each other, though Mike sees clearly how mercenary she is. A love triangle forms. Tino comes to resent Mike's attempts to warn him about Lola, so he breaks up with Mike. 

However, during a performance attended by circus VIP John Ringling North, Mike talks Tino into attempting the triple. Bouglione, the circus owner, tries to stop them by having the safety net taken down, but Tino goes ahead anyway and achieves the highly dangerous feat. A greatly impressed North immediately offers all three a job with his circus. Tino wants Mike back, but he leaves. Lola follows her heart (and Mike).

Cast
 Burt Lancaster as Mike Ribble
 Tony Curtis as Tino Orsini
 Gina Lollobrigida as Lola
 Katy Jurado as Rosa
 Thomas Gomez as Bouglione
 Johnny Puleo as Max
 Minor Watson as John Ringling North
 Gérard Landry as Chikki
 Jean-Pierre Kérien as Otto
 Sid James as Harry the Snake Charmer
 Gamil Ratib as Stefan

Production
Lancaster, a former circus acrobat, performed many of his own stunts, though the most dangerous (including the climactic triple somersault) were performed by technical consultant Eddie Ward from the Ringling Brothers Circus.

Trapeze was filmed entirely in Paris, including at the Cirque d'hiver and at the nearby Billancourt studios.

Reception

Lancaster won the Silver Bear for Best Actor award at the 6th Berlin International Film Festival. Reed was nominated for best director by the Directors Guild of America.

Pauline Kael of The New Yorker wrote: "There's vitality in Carol Reed's direction, and an exuberant sweep in Robert Krasker's camera work. Burt Lancaster and Gina Lollobrigida function as stars--they're magnetic."

Bosley Crowther, one of the most outspoken critics of his time, panned the film in his review for The New York Times, writing that the story was "dismally obvious and monotonous", the direction no better and the dialogue "dull and hackneyed." He also criticized the film's leads, writing that Lollobrigida offered nothing beyond her beauty and that Curtis and Lancaster were both uninteresting.

See also
 List of American films of 1956

References

External links

 
 
 
 

1956 films
1956 drama films
American drama films
CinemaScope films
Circus films
Films based on British novels
Films directed by Carol Reed
Films produced by Burt Lancaster
Films produced by James Hill
Films produced by Harold Hecht
Films scored by Malcolm Arnold
Films with screenplays by Ben Hecht
Films with screenplays by Wolf Mankowitz
Norma Productions films
United Artists films
1950s English-language films
1950s American films